The Pisa class consisted of three armored cruisers built in Italy in the first decade of the 20th century. Two of these were for the Royal Italian Navy (Regia Marina) and the third was sold to the Royal Hellenic Navy and named . This ship served as the Greek flagship for the bulk of her active career and participated in the Balkan Wars of 1912–1913, fighting in two battles against the Ottoman Navy. She played a minor role in World War II after escaping from Greece during the German invasion in early 1941. Influenced by communist agitators, her crew mutinied in 1944, but it was suppressed without any bloodshed. Georgios Averof returned to Greece after the German evacuation in late 1944 and became a museum ship in 1952. She is the only surviving armored cruiser in the world.

The two Italian ships participated in the Italo-Turkish War of 1911–1912 during which they supported ground forces in Libya with naval gunfire and helped to occupy towns in Libya and islands in the Dodecanese. They played a minor role in World War I after a submarine sank  shortly after Italy joined the war in 1915. Her sister ship, became a training ship after the war and was broken up for scrap in 1937.

Design and description

The Pisa class was designed in 1904 by Italian engineer Giuseppe Orlando, who attempted to replicate on a smaller scale the armament and armor of the s then entering the service of the Regia Marina. The Italians classified large armored cruisers like the Pisas as second-class battleships. For ships of their displacement, they were considered to have been heavily armed, but inferior to battlecruisers, a type introduced during their lengthy construction time.

The Pisa class had a complement of 32 officers and 652 to 655 enlisted men.

Propulsion
The ships were powered by two vertical triple-expansion steam engines, each driving one propeller shaft using steam supplied by 22 Belleville boilers.

Armament

The main armament of the two Italian Pisa-class ships consisted of four Cannone da 254/45 V Modello 1906 guns in hydraulically powered, twin-gun turrets fore and aft of the superstructure. The Royal Hellenic Navy preferred smaller 234 mm (9.2 in) guns purchased from Britain for Georgios Averof, but the ship was otherwise armed nearly identically to her half-sisters.

The Italian ships mounted eight Cannone da 190/45 V Modello 1906 in four hydraulically powered twin-gun turrets, two in each side amidships, as their secondary armament. These Vickers  guns fired

For defense against torpedo boats, all three ships mounted 16 Vickers quick-firing (QF) Cannone da 76/50 V Modello 1908 guns. The ships were also fitted with eight (Pisa and Amalfi) or four (Georgios Averof) QF Cannone da 47/40 V Modello 1908 guns.

During World War I, Pisas 76 and 47 mm guns were replaced by twenty 76/40 guns; six of these were anti-aircraft (AA) guns while Georgios Averof received one additional 76 mm AA gun. During her 1925 refit, the latter ship had her light armament changed to four 76 mm low-angle guns, two 76 mm AA guns, four 47 mm low-angle guns and five 40 mm AA guns.

Protection

Ships

Careers 

Two of the three Pisa-class armored cruisers were originally built for the Regia Marina. The third ship was built on speculation and was sold to Greece and completed as Georgios Averof, named after a wealthy Greek businessman who had left a sizeable legacy for the increase of the Greek Navy in his will. The ship participated in the Coronation Fleet Review for King George V of the United Kingdom in 1911 shortly after commissioning. She served in the Balkan Wars and was instrumental in the Greek victories over the Ottoman Empire in the Battles of Elli and Lemnos during the First Balkan War. During World War I, Georgios Averof did not see much active service, as Greece was neutral during the first years of the war. After the Noemvriana riots of 1916, she was seized by the French to ensure that she could do nothing against the Entente. After the war's end, the ship participated in the Greco-Turkish War of 1919–1922 and helped in the evacuation of the refugees after the Greek Army's defeat. In 1925–1927 Georgios Averof was reconstructed in France and rearmed.

The ship was seized by rebels during the failed 1935 Greek coup d'état attempt and was present at the 1935 Silver Jubilee Fleet Review for King George V. During World War II, the ship escaped to Egypt after the Allied defense began to collapse in 1941 during the Battle of Greece. She performed convoy escort and patrolling duties in the Indian Ocean until the end of 1942. Her crew mutinied in early 1944 under the influence of communist sympathizers of the National Liberation Front. The mutiny was suppressed and she ferried the Greek government-in-exile to Athens in late 1944. She was decommissioned in 1952 and is now preserved as a museum ship in Faliron Bay near Athens. Georgios Averof is the only armored cruiser still in existence.

Pisa and Amalfi both participated in the Italo-Turkish War of 1911–1912, during which Pisa supported the occupations of Tobruk, Libya and several islands in the Dodecanese while Amalfi briefly blockaded Tripoli and supported the occupation of Derna, Libya. The sisters came together in 1912 and they bombarded the fortifications defending the entrance to the Dardanelles in July. After the end of the war, Amalfi escorted the Italian king and queen on the royal yacht to Germany and Sweden during a 1913 visit.

After Amalfi was sunk by the submarine  (actually the Imperial German submarine SM UB-14 flying the Austro-Hungarian flag) on 7 July 1915, Pisas activities were limited by the threat of submarine attack, although the ship did participate in the bombardment of Durazzo, Albania in late 1918. After the war she became a training ship and was stricken from the Navy List in 1937 before being scrapped.

Notes

Footnotes

References

External links

 Classe Pisa Marina Militare website
Official website of the Giorgios Averof

 
Cruisers of the Regia Marina

Cruiser classes